Rafael Nuritdinov (born 12 June 1977 in Fergana) is an Uzbek former road racing cyclist.

Major results 
2001
 1st Gran Premio Industria e Commercio Artigianato Carnaghese
 5th Giro d'Oro
2002
 7th Trofeo Città di Castelfidardo
 10th Overall Hessen Rundfahrt
2004
 National Road Championships
1st  Road race
2nd Time trial

External links 
 

Uzbekistani male cyclists
1977 births
People from Fergana
Living people
Cyclists at the 1998 Asian Games
Cyclists at the 2002 Asian Games
Asian Games competitors for Uzbekistan
21st-century Uzbekistani people